LNC may refer to:

 Lancaster Regional Airport, a public-use airfield in Lancaster, Texas, United States (FAA identification code)
Lancaster station (Pennsylvania), a train station in Lancaster, Pennsylvania, United States (Amtrak station code)
 Late Night Counsell, an Ottawa late night talk radio show
 Law of Non-Contradiction, one of Aristotle's  three classic laws of thought
 Legal nurse consultant, a health care professional that aids in legal cases
 Leszynski naming convention, a guide for programming notation
 Lëvizja Nacionale Çlirimtare or National Liberation Movement, an Albanian resistance organization during World War II
 Coalition (Australia), political alliance of the Liberal and National parties in Australia
 Libertarian National Committee
 Libertarian National Convention
 Local News on Cable Virginia
 London Necropolis Company
 Low noise converter, a device used in satellite receivers